Acetone oxime (acetoxime) is the organic compound with the formula (CH3)2CNOH.  It is the simplest example of a ketoxime. It is a white crystalline solid that is soluble in water, ethanol, ether, chloroform, and ligroin.  It is used as a reagent in organic synthesis.

Acetone oxime (acetoxime) was first prepared and named in 1882 by the German chemist Victor Meyer and his Swiss student Alois Janny.

Preparation 
Acetone oxime is synthesized by the condensation of acetone and hydroxylamine in the presence of HCl:
(CH3)2CO  +  H2NOH   →   (CH3)2CNOH  +  H2O
It can also be generated via ammoxidation of acetone in the presence of hydrogen peroxide.

Uses
Acetone oxime is an excellent corrosion inhibitor (deoxidant) with lower toxicity and greater stability compared to the common agent hydrazine. It is also useful in the determination of ketones, cobalt and in organic synthesis.

References 

Ketoximes